Sha Qianli (1901 – April 26, 1982) was a Chinese male politician, who served as the vice chairperson of the Chinese People's Political Consultative Conference.

References 

1901 births
1982 deaths
Vice Chairpersons of the National Committee of the Chinese People's Political Consultative Conference